The Minyon Falls is a plunge waterfall on Repentance Creek in the Northern Rivers region of New South Wales, Australia. The water flow eroded the rocks to create the waterfall.

Location and features
The waterfall is a popular visitor attraction and is located within easy reach of the nearby town of Byron Bay in the Nightcap National Park, which was added to the Gondwana Rainforests of Australia World Heritage Site in 1986.

The National Parks and Wildlife Service manages the area as part of the Nightcap National Park, and provides facilities for visitors, including a 50m boardwalk to the lookout which is wheelchair accessible, several picnic tables and barbecue facilities at the top of the falls. Visitors are able to explore the bottom of the falls and the sub-tropical rainforest along designated walking trails, all of which involve steep hills, with some scrambling over wet rocks at the base of the falls. One trail follows a route  from the top of the falls, across the ridge, near Quandong Falls, down into the valley to the bottom of the Minyon falls, it continues  to Minyon Grass, then joins the road for  back to the falls car park to form a loop. A shorter,  track runs from Minyon Grass to the bottom of the falls. Another walking trail in the area is the Boggy Creek Walk from the Rummery Park Campground to the top of the Falls (45 minutes each way).

Flora and fauna
The top of the falls is surrounded by wet sclerophyll forest with some very tall blackbutt, tallowwood and flooded gum trees. Visitors to the falls regularly observe wildlife such as lace monitor (goanna), kookaburra, satin bowerbird, noisy pitta, eastern yellow robin, pale yellow robin, scrub wren, peregrine falcon, bobuck possum, northern and long-nosed bandicoot, tawny frogmouth, stony creek frog, red-eyed green tree frog, eastern whipbird, wonga pigeon, white-headed pigeon, yellow tailed black cockatoo, little shrike-thrush, tree-creeper, carpet python, and green tree snake. There are also occasional alberts lyrebird, koala and pademelon sightings. In wet weather conditions, visitors may be encounter leeches.

The Minyon valley is a sub-tropical rainforest, vegetation includes: Bangalow palm, brushbox, strangler fig, stream lily, walking stick palm, rusty rose walnut, blue quandong, broad leaved palm lily, tree fern, red lilly pilly, white bark, birds nest fern, stag horn fern, brushbox orchid and native wisteria vine.

Access
Minyon Falls' proximity to towns such as Byron Bay, Ballina and Lismore make it a popular attraction, and the falls can be reached by car in approximately 45 minutes (1 hour from Ballina or Lismore). The falls can also be visited from the Gold Coast, which is a 2-hour journey via the Pacific Highway. The road to the falls is an unsealed road and can be difficult at times to drive. 

Various local tour companies offer trips to the Minyon Falls.

Water Flow 
Repentance Creek (used to be called Boggy Creek) is the water that feeds the falls. Most of the time there is water on the waterfall, but the amount of water can vary. During drier times, the waterfall dries up and the plunge pool at the bottom becomes un-swimmable.

History
Minyon Falls is located in the traditional lands of the Bundjalung peoples.

Minyon Falls was formed from a volcanic erosion of the dormant Tweed Volcano around 23 million years ago during the Cenozoic era. The plunge waterfall has remained part of the Nimbin Rhyolite of the Lamington Volcanics. 

Today Minyon Falls endures as a scenic spot and is present within subtropical forests of the Nightcap National Park.

See also

List of waterfalls of Australia

References
You can download a free copy of "Bushwalking in the Rainbow Region" from http://budjiri.biz.ht/

External links
 Nightcap National Park website

Waterfalls of New South Wales
Tourist attractions in New South Wales
Plunge waterfalls
Northern Rivers